The Reynard 913 is an open-wheel Formula 3 race car, developed and built by Reynard in 1991.

References

Open wheel racing cars
Formula Three cars
Reynard Motorsport vehicles